The 1986 San Jose Earthquakes season was the thirteenth overall for the franchise, and the club's second in the Western Soccer Alliance. The Earthquakes finished the
season in sixth place. With no playoffs, the first-place Hollywood Kickers were league champions.

Squad
The 1986 squad

Competitions

Western Soccer Alliance

Match results 

Source:

Standings 

Standings include games played against Manchester City and Dundee FC.

References

External links
The Year in American Soccer – 1986 | WSA
San Jose Earthquakes Game Results | Soccerstats.us

San Jose Earthquakes seasons
San Jose
1986 in sports in California